Marian Bell may refer to:

 Marian Bell (economist) (born 1957), British economist
 Marian Bell (field hockey) (born 1958), former Australian field hockey player